Baqên County is a county within Nagqu of the Tibet Autonomous Region. The seat of the county is Baqên Town.

It is located in northeastern Tibet and borders with Qinghai.

Transport 
China National Highway 317

References

Counties of Tibet
Nagqu